Baines is a surname of English, Scottish or Welsh origin. It shares many of the same roots with the British surname Bains. It shares some roots with the British surname Bain.

Derivation and variants
Baines has a number of different sources, several of them nicknames and another based on an occupation. In Scotland and the north of England the Old English word bān ('bone') became Middle English bān and bain. It may have become a nickname in the plural, meaning 'bones' or '[long-]legs' (cf. modern German Bein, also meaning both "bone" and "leg"). The Middle English bayn, beyn and the Old Norse beinn meant 'straight' or 'direct', which may have become a nickname. The Middle English bayne (and  French bain) meant 'bath'. This may have become an occupational surname for an attendant at a public bath.

Baines may also have Welsh roots, from the patronymic ab Einws ('son of Einws'). Einws is a shortened version of the Welsh name Ennion, meaning 'Anvil'.

Variants of the surname Baines include Bains, Banes, Baynes and Bayns.

Frequency of occurrence
At the time of the British Census of 1881, its relative frequency was highest in Rutland (31.2 times the British average), followed by Westmorland, Lincolnshire, Yorkshire, Leicestershire, Lancashire, Nottinghamshire, Montgomeryshire and Bedfordshire.

Hanks and Hodges suggest in their "A Dictionary of Surnames" that many present day Baines descend from Robert Baines of Ipswich, Suffolk, England (born ).
John Baines, Liverpool, England, Doctor of Physics.

Notable people with the surname Baines
(In alphabetical order)

 Ajay Baines, Canadian ice hockey player
 Andrew Baines, Australian artist
 Anthony Baines, English musicologist
 Charlie Baines (1896–1954), English footballer
 Chris Baines (born 1947), English gardener, naturalist, television presenter and author
 Edward Baines (1774–1848), English newspaper-proprietor and politician
 Edward Baines (1800–1890), son of the above, also a nonconformist English newspaper editor and Member of Parliament
 Frank Baines (1877–1933), English architect
 Lewis Baines (1998–present) English footballer playing for Fleetwood Town
 Francis Baines (1648–1710), English Jesuit
 Sir George Grenfell-Baines, English architect
 George Washington Baines (1809–1882), grandfather of president Lyndon Baines Johnson
 Harold Baines, former right fielder and designated hitter in Major League Baseball
 Jervoise Athelstane Baines, Census Commissioner in British India
 John Baines (born 1946), incumbent Professor of Egyptology at the University of Oxford
 Kate Baines (born 1978), English actress
 Leighton Baines (born 1984) English footballer
 Matthew Talbot Baines (1799–1860), British lawyer and Liberal politician
 Michael Baines (1898–1990), English cricketer and British Army officer
 Nicholas M. Baines (born 1978), English keyboard player (Kaiser Chiefs)
 Nick Baines (bishop) (born 1957), Bishop of Croydon
 Paul Baines (academic) (born 1973), British marketing academic
 Paul Baines (footballer) (born 1972), former English footballer
 Peter Augustine Baines (1787–1843), English Benedictine
 Richard Baines, historical figure - Informant against Christopher Marlowe
 Robert A. Baines (born 1946), former mayor of Manchester, New Hampshire
 Steve Baines (born 1954), former English footballer
 Thomas Baines (1820–1875), English artist and explorer
 Thomas Baines (Ontario) (1799–1867), Canadian Crown Land Agent
 William Baines (1899–1922), English pianist and composer

Distribution
As a surname, Baines is the 1,732nd most common surname in Great Britain, with 6,209 bearers. It is most common in Lancashire, where it is the 626th most common surname, with 1,784 bearers. Other concentrations include, Swansea, (88th,1,704), City of Leeds, (167th,1,722), and West Yorkshire, (380th, 1,702).

See also
 Bain (disambiguation)
 Baine (disambiguation)
 Bains (disambiguation)
 Lyndon B. Johnson
 Banes (disambiguation) 
 Baynes, a surname

References

Welsh-language surnames
English-language surnames
Surnames of Welsh origin
Surnames of Lowland Scottish origin